Events from the year 1873 in the United States.

Incumbents

Federal Government 
 President: Ulysses S. Grant (R-Illinois)
 Vice President: Schuyler Colfax (R-Indiana) (until March 4), Henry Wilson (R-Massachusetts) (starting March 4)
 Chief Justice: Salmon P. Chase (Ohio) (until May 7)
 Speaker of the House of Representatives: James G. Blaine (R-Maine)
 Congress: 42nd (until March 4), 43rd (starting March 4)

Events

January–March

 January 1 – The California Penal Code goes into effect.
 January 17 – Indian Wars: The first Battle of the Stronghold is fought during the Modoc War.
 February 20 – The University of California opens its first medical school in San Francisco.
 March - Downers Grove, Illinois is incorporated.
 March 1 – E. Remington and Sons of Ilion, New York, start production of the first practical typewriter.
 March 3 – Censorship: The U.S. Congress enacts the Comstock Law, making it illegal to send any "obscene, lewd, or lascivious" books through the mail.
 March 4 – President Ulysses S. Grant begins his second term. Henry Wilson sworn in as Vice President of the United States.
 March 15 – The Phi Sigma Kappa fraternity is founded at the Massachusetts Agricultural College.
 March 22 – Emancipation Day for Puerto Rico: Slaves are freed (with a few exceptions).

April–June
 April 1 
 The Coinage Act of 1873 comes into force, ending bimetallism in the U.S. and placing the nation firmly on the gold standard.
 Hinsdale, Illinois is incorporated.
 April 13 – Between 62 and 153 Republican freedmen and state militia die in the Colfax massacre while attempting to protect the Grant Parish courthouse, including about 50 who surrendered.
 April 15–17 – Indian Wars: The Second Battle of the Stronghold is fought.
 May – Henry Rose exhibits barbed wire at an Illinois county fair, which is taken up by Joseph Glidden and Jacob Haish, who invent a machine to mass-produce it.
 May 13 – First U.S. postal card is issued.
 May 20 – Levi Strauss and Jacob Davis receive United States patent#139121 for using copper rivets to strengthen the pockets of denim work pants. Levi Strauss & Co. begin manufacturing the famous Levi's brand of jeans, using fabric from the Amoskeag Manufacturing Company in Manchester, New Hampshire.
 May 23 – 
 The Preakness Stakes horse race first runs in Baltimore, Maryland.
 Postal cards are sold in San Francisco for the first time.
 June 2 – Construction begins on the Clay Street Hill Railroad in San Francisco.
 June 4 – Indian Wars: The Modoc War ends with the capture of Kintpuash ("Captain Jack").

July–September
 July 21 – At Adair, Iowa, Jesse James and the James-Younger Gang pull off the first successful train robbery in the American West (US$3,000 from the Rock Island Express).
 August 4 – Indian Wars: While protecting a railroad survey party in Montana, the Seventh Cavalry, under Lieutenant Colonel George Armstrong Custer, clashes for the first time with the Sioux, near the Tongue River (only 1 man on each side is killed).
 September 6 – Regular cable car service begins on Clay Street, San Francisco.
 September 17 – The Ohio Agricultural and Mechanical College, later Ohio State University, opens its doors with 25 students, including 2 women.
 September 18 – The New York stock market crash triggers the Panic of 1873, part of the Long Depression.

October–December
 October 30 – P.T. Barnum's circus, The Greatest Show on Earth, debuts in New York City.
 December 15 – Women of Fredonia, New York march against the retail liquor dealers in town, inaugurating the Women's Crusade of 1873–74. This leads to the creation of the Woman's Christian Temperance Union.
 December 23 – Women's Crusade spreads to Hillsboro, Ohio.
 December 25 – Delta Gamma sorority founded in Oxford, Mississippi.

Undated

 Railroads connect Northern Michigan port cities of Ludington, Traverse City and Petoskey.
 Coors Brewing Company begins making beer in Golden, Colorado.
 Central Park is officially completed in New York City.
 Nine Pekin ducks are imported to Long Island (the first in the United States).
 Eliza Daniel Stewart organizes the Woman's Temperance League in Osborn, Ohio.

Ongoing
 Reconstruction era (1865–1877)
 Gilded Age (1869–c. 1896)
 Depression of 1873–79 (1873–1879)

Births
 January 2 – John M. Robsion, U.S. Senator from Kentucky in 1930 (died 1948)
 January 4 – Blanche Walsh, stage and screen actress (died 1915)
 January 8 – Grace Van Studdiford, stage actress and opera singer (died 1927)
 January 9 – Thomas Curtis, hurdler (died 1944)
 February 4 – Joel R. P. Pringle, admiral (died 1932)
 February 11 – Louis Charles Christopher Krieger, mycologist (died 1940)
 March 3 – William Green, labor leader (died 1952)
 March 5 – Thomas Harrison Montgomery, Jr., zoologist and cell biologist (died 1912)
 March 29 – Billy Quirk, silent film actor (died 1926)
 April 7 –  John McGraw, baseball player and manager (died 1934)
 April 13 – John W. Davis, politician, diplomat and lawyer (died 1955)
 May 5 – Leon Czolgosz, assassin of President William McKinley (executed 1901)
 May 9
Anton Cermak, Mayor of Chicago (died 1933)
Lois Irene Marshall, née Kimsey, Second Lady of the United States as wife of Thomas R. Marshall (died 1958)
 April 22 – Ellen Glasgow, novelist (died 1945)
 July 6 – Ethel Sands, painter (died 1962 in the United Kingdom)
 July 11 – Nat M. Wills, vaudeville entertainer (died 1917)
 August 3 – Alexander Posey, Native American poet, journalist, humorist and politician (drowned 1908)
 August 5 – Joseph Russell Knowland, politician and newspaperman (died 1966)
 August 10 – William Ernest Hocking, philosopher (died 1966)
 August 11 – J. Rosamond Johnson, African American composer and singer (died 1954)
 August 17 – John A. Sampson, gynecologist (died 1946)
 August 18 – Otto Harbach, lyricist (died 1963)
 August 21 – Harry T. Morey, stage and screen actor (died 1936)
 August 25 – Blanche Bates, stage and screen actress (died 1941)
 August 26 – Lee de Forest, inventor (died 1961)
 September 2 – Bessie Van Vorst, campaigning journalist (died 1928)
 September 5 – Cornelius Vanderbilt III, military officer, inventor and engineer (died 1942)
 September 8 – David O. McKay, president of the Church of Jesus Christ of Latter-day Saints (died 1970)
 September 14 – Josiah Bailey, U.S. Senator from North Carolina from 1931 to 1946 (died 1946)
 September 21 – Papa Jack Laine, New Orleans brass band leader (died 1966)
 October 2 – Stephen Warfield Gambrill, U.S. Congressman for Maryland's 5th District (died 1924)
 October 3 – Emily Post, etiquette expert (died 1960)
 October 8 – Ma Barker, née Kate Clark, matriarch of the Barker–Karpis gang (killed 1935)
 October 9 – Charles Rudolph Walgreen, businessman (died 1939)
 October 10 – George Cabot Lodge, poet (died 1909)
 October 14 – Ray Ewry, field athlete (died 1937)
 October 17 – William Luther Hill, U.S. Senator from Florida in 1936 (died 1951)
 October 18 – Harris Laning, admiral (died 1941)
 October 19 – Bart King, cricketer (died 1965)
 October 29 – Lester J. Dickinson, U.S. Senator from Iowa from 1931 to 1937 (died 1968)
 November 10 – David Lynn, architect, Architect of the Capitol from 1923 to 1954 (died 1961)
 November 16 – W. C. Handy, African American composer, "father of the Blues" (died 1958)
 November 28 – Frank Phillips, oil executive (died 1950)
 December 7 – Willa Cather, novelist (died 1947)
 December 12 – Lola Ridge, poet (died 1941)
 December 30 – Al Smith,  politician (died 1944)
 Undated – Thomas Chrostwaite, educator (died 1958)

Deaths
 February 1 – Matthew Fontaine Maury, oceanographer (born 1806)
 March 4 – Alfred Iverson, Sr., U.S. Senator from Georgia from 1855 to 1861 (born 1798)
 March 10 – John Torrey, botanist (born 1796)
 March 27 – James Dixon, U.S. Senator from Connecticut from 1857 to 1869 (born 1814)
 March 31 – Hugh Maxwell, lawyer and politician (born 1787)
 April 11 – Edward Canby, general (born 1817)
 May 7 – Salmon P. Chase, 6th Chief Justice of the United States, 25th United States Secretary of the Treasury (born 1808)
 May 9 – Frederick Goddard Tuckerman, poet (born 1821)
 June 11 – Richard Saltonstall Rogers, shipping merchant and politician (born 1790)
 October 5 – William Todd, businessman and Canadian senate nominee (born 1803)
 November 9 – Stephen Mallory, U.S. Senator from Florida from 1851 to 1861 (born 1812)
 November 27 – Richard Yates, U.S. Senator from Illinois from 1865 to 1871 (born 1815)
 December 14 – Louis Agassiz, geologist and zoologist (born 1807 in Switzerland)
 December 24 – Johns Hopkins, entrepreneur and benefactor (born 1795)

See also
Timeline of United States history (1860–1899)

References

External links
 

 
1870s in the United States
United States
United States
Years of the 19th century in the United States